Punamusta a printing and graphic design company in Joensuu, Finland. Its current (2010) director is Jari Avellan.

Punamusta is one of the largest printing companies in Finland. It is part of Pohjois-Karjalan Kirjapaino Plc. group headquartered in North Karelia, which also includes several local newspapers, including the Karjalainen daily newspaper, and a printing unit for packaging industry.

Punamusta prints brochures, advertising and promotional materials, newspapers, and magazines. It prints a number of magazines for Finnish, Russian and Scandinavian markets.

External links
Punamusta home page
The European Business Directory

Publishing companies of Finland
Mass media in Joensuu